Moridan Rural District is a rural district (dehestan) in Kumeleh District, Langarud County, Gilan Province, Iran. At the 2006 census, its population was 5,532, in 1,633 families. The rural district has 11 villages.

References 

Rural Districts of Gilan Province
Langarud County